Jefferson Township High School is a public high school located near Dayton, Ohio.  It is the only high school in the Jefferson Township Local Schools district.  Their nickname is the Broncos.

The school was mentioned in the Kurt Vonnegut novel Breakfast of Champions.

Ohio High School Athletic Association State Championships

 Basketball - 1979,1998,2010
 Boys Track and Field – 1957,1977,1980,1983,1986,1987,1988,1994,2004 
 Girls Track and Field – 1976,1977,1979

Notable alumni
 John W. Griffin, perennial candidate for various local, state, and federal offices in Ohio
 Cody Latimer, NFL wide receiver
 Manning Marable, professor, columnist, and Pulitzer Prize winning author of Malcolm X: A Life of Reinvention
 Adreian Payne, professional basketball player (NBA)
 Al Tucker, former professional basketball player (NBA)

References

External links
 District Website

High schools in Dayton, Ohio
Public high schools in Ohio